The Committee for the Defense of the Unjustly Prosecuted (as a result the acronym VONS is used) was a Czechoslovak dissident organization founded largely by Charter 77 signatories. VONS was founded on 27 April 1978.

Founding and political aims
The Committee for the Defense of the Unjustly Prosecuted sought to support dissidents and their families. VONS also wanted to educate the general public about the plight of dissidents. VONS was largely, if not completely, founded by Charter 77 signatories. However, it was largely independent from Charter 77.

Work
The organization also became a member of the International Federation for Human Rights, under the name Czechoslovak League for Human Rights. VONS also cooperated with human rights organizations such as Amnesty International and Helsinki Watch. Many of the founders, such as Václav Havel, became involved in politics after the 1989 Velvet Revolution.

Government's reaction
Shortly after the founding of VONS, Václav Havel and five other representatives of the organizations were arrested and sentenced for two to five years in prison. It can be assumed that like Charter 77 and the plight of various dissidents during the communist era, VONS was by no means warmly welcomed by the communist government. Many of the members of the Committee were persecuted by Czechoslovak secret police.

See also
Charter 77

References

External links
VONS website

Organizations based in Czechoslovakia
Anti-communist organizations
1978 establishments in Czechoslovakia
Organizations established in 1978